Simpson's Hospital is a nursing home in Dundrum, Dublin, Ireland.

History
The hospital was founded under the terms of the will of George Simpson, a merchant who lived at 24 Jervis Street, Dublin, in 1779. He suffered from blindness and gout. He devised his estate for the purpose of founding an asylum for blind and gouty men in reduced circumstances. Inmates of the hospital were to be lodged, fed and clothed.

On his death in 1775 his trustees bought Putland House for £3,600, but it was found inconvenient as a hospital. In 1784 the inmates were removed to Judge Robinson's house in Jervis Street (on part of the Jervis Street Hospital site), before the hospital moved to a house known as Wyckham, its present location, in Dundrum in 1925. It continues to function as a nursing home for elderly people.

References

External links

Hospitals in Dublin (city)
1779 establishments in Ireland